Simon is a common name, from Hebrew שִׁמְעוֹן Šimʻôn, meaning "listen" or "hearing". It is also a classical Greek name, deriving from an adjective meaning "flat-nosed". In the first century AD, Simon was the most popular male name for Jews in Roman Judea.

The Hebrew name is Hellenised as Symeon in the Septuagint, and in the New Testament as both Symeon and, according to most authorities, Simon. Some commentators on the New Testament say that it could be a Hellenised form of the Hebrew Shim'on, but if not then it indicates that Peter came from a "Hellenistic background"; this was not unheard of in this era, as contemporary Jews such as Andrew the Apostle (Simon's brother) sometimes bore originally Greek names.

Simon is one Latinised version of the name, the others being Simeon or Symeon. This practice carried over into English: in the King James Version, the name Simeon Niger is spelt Simeon (Acts 13:1) as is Simeon (Gospel of Luke), while Peter is called Simon.

In other languages 
Ancient Greek: Σίμων (Simon). This name appears in Greek mythology as one of the Telchines. In Greek means "flat-nosed". Συμεών is the Hellenization of the name found in the Septuagint and parts of the New Testament, this form continues in use through the mediaeval era, viz. Symeon the New Theologian.
 Albanian: Simon, Simeon
 Amharic: ስምዖን, Smeon
 Arabic: سِمْعَان (Simʻān), شَمْعُون (Šamʻūn)
 Aramaic (old): Šimʻōn (Shim'on)
 Aramaic (middle and modern): ܫܡܥܘܢ (Šëmʻūn, Shem'un), (Sëmʻān, Semaan)
 Aragonese: Simón
 Azerbaijani: Şımon
 Basque: Simon or, sometimes, Ximun
 Belarusian: Сымон (Symon), Сямён (Sjamyon)
 Bengali: সাইমন (Saimon), শিমন (Šimon), সিমন (Simon)
 Breton : Simon
 Bulgarian: Симеон (Simeon)
 Catalan: Simó
 Chinese Simplified: 西蒙 (Xīméng), 西门 (Xīmén)
 Chinese Traditional: 西蒙 (Xīméng), 西門 (Xīmén)
 Croatian: Šimun
 Czech: Šimon
 Danish: Simon
 Dutch: Simon, Simeon, Siem 
 English: Simon
 Esperanto: Simono
 Estonian: Siimon, Siim, Simon, Siimeon
 Faroese: Símun, Símin, Simona, Mona
 Finnish: Simo, Simon, Simeoni
 French: Simon
 Galician: Simón
 Georgian: სჳმეონ (Swimeon), სჳმონ (Swimon), სიმონ (Simon)
 German: Simon
 Greek: Συμεών (Simeón), Σύμος (Símos)
 Gujarati: સિમોન (Simōna)
 Hebrew: שמעון (Šimʻōn, Shimeon, Shimon)
 Hindi: साइमन (Sā'imana)
 Hmong: Ximoos
 Hungarian: Semjén, Simon
 Icelandic: Símon
 Indonesian: Simon
 Irish: Síomón
 Italian: Simone
 Japanese: サイモン (Saimon), シメオン（Simeon), シモン (Shimon)
 Kannada: ಸೈಮನ್ (Saiman)
 Korean: 시몬(Simon)
 Latin: Simeonus, Simonis, Symeon
 Latvian: Sīmanis, Sīmans, Simons, Saimons
 Lithuanian: Simonas, Šimonas
 Macedonian: Симон (Simon), Симеон (Simeon)
 Malayalam: ശിമയോൻ (Shimayon), സൈമൺ (Simon), Chummar, ചുമ്മാർ
 Maltese: Xmun
 Maori: Haimona
 Marathi: सायमन (Sāyamana)
 Mongolian: Симон (Simon)
 Nepali: सिमोन (Simōna)
 Norwegian: Simon, Simen
 Occitan: Simon
 Persian: Saman
 Polish: Szymon
 Portuguese: Simão 
 Prekmurje dialect of Slovene: Šimon
 Punjabi: ਸ਼ਮਊਨ (Śama'ūna)
 Quechua: Simun
 Romanian: Simion
 Russian: Симон (Simon), Семён (Semyon)
 Scottish Gaelic: Sim
 Serbian: Симон (Simon), Симеон (Simeon), Симеун (Simeun), Симо (Simo)
 Slovak: Simon, Šimon
 Slovene: Simon
 Spanish: Simón, Jimeno
 Swahili: Simoni
 Swedish: Simon
 Syriac: ܫܡܥܘܢ (Shemon, pronounced: ʃɛmʕon)
 Tamil: சைமன் (Caimaṉ)
 Telugu: సీమెాను (Simonu)
 Thai: ไซมอน (Sị mxn)
 Tigrinya: ስምኦን (Simi'on)
 Ukrainian: Семен (Semen), Симон (Symon), Саймон (Saymon)
 Urdu: سائمن
 Vietnamese: Sỹ Minh, Xi Mông 
 Welsh: Simwnt, Seimon
 Turkish: şimon
 Yiddish: שמעון

List of people with the given name Simon 
Simon is a common name and below is just a selection of notable people. For a comprehensive list see .

Ancient
Simon the Shoemaker (5th century BCE), friend of Socrates 
Simon Thassi (r. 141-135 BCE), high priest of Jerusalem and ruler of Judaea
Simon of Peraea (died 4 BCE), Jewish rebel mentioned by Josephus
Simon the Zealot, apostle of Jesus 
Simon bar Giora, (died 70 CE), Judean leader in the First Jewish-Roman War
Simon bar Kokhba
 Simon of Bet-Parsaje (died 339), Christian martyred with Mana of Bet-Parsaje
Simon of Bet-Titta (died 447), Christian martyr

Medieval
Simeon I of Bulgaria (died 927), tsar of the First Bulgarian Empire
Simon the Tanner (10th century), Coptic saint
Simon of Kalocsa (fl. 1108–1142), Hungarian prelate
Simon, Bishop of Transylvania (fl. 1111–1113), Hungarian prelate
Simon of Worcester (died 1150), English Bishop of Worcester
Simon de Montfort, 6th Earl of Leicester (1208–1265) Leader of the barons against Henry III 
Simon Kacsics (fl. 1212–1228), Hungarian lord
Simon Kacsics, Count of the Székelys (fl. 1291–1327), Hungarian lord
Simon of Southwell, canon lawyer and Treasurer of Lichfield Cathedral
Simon Sudbury (died 1381) English Archbishop and Lord Chancellor
Simon, Metropolitan of Moscow (died 1512), Russian Orthodox leader

Renaissance to modern
Simon Abeywickrema (1903–1948), Sri Lankan politician
Simon Abkarian (born 1962), French actor
Simon Adjei (born 1993), Swedish footballer
Simon Ammann (born 1981), Swiss ski jumper
Simon Amstell (born 1979), English television presenter
Simon Armitage (born 1979), English poet, playwright and novelist who was appointed Poet Laureate in May 2019
Simon Appiah Asamoah (born 2002), Ghanaian footballer
Simon Arora (born 1969), British billionaire businessman
Simon Aspelin (born 1974), Swedish tennis player
Simon Baker (born 1969), Australian actor and director
Simon Barere (1896–1951), Russian-born American pianist
Simon Baron-Cohen (born 1958), British autism researcher
Simon Baynes, British politician
Simon Beckett (born 1960), British journalist and author
Simon Bening (1483–1561), Flemish miniaturist
Simon van den Bergh (1819–1907), Dutch margarine manufacturer, founder of Unilever
Simón Bolívar (1783–1830), Latin American military and political leader
Simon Bolivar Buckner (1823–1914), American soldier and Governor of Kentucky
Simon Callow (born 1949), British actor
Simon Cameron (1799–1889), American politician and Secretary of War 
Simon Carmiggelt (1913–1987), Dutch poet, columnist and satirist
Simon Chang (born 1947), Chinese-Canadian fashion designer
Simon Conway Morris (born 1951), English palaeontologist
Simon Coveney (born 1972), Irish government minister
Simon Cowell (born 1959), British television personality
Simon Dach (1605–1659), Prussian lyrical poet
Simon Davies (disambiguation), several people
Simon Donaldson (born 1957), English mathematician
Simon Dring (1945–2021), British journalist and television presenter
Simon During (born 1950), New Zealand-Australian academic
Simon Episcopius (1583–1643), Dutch theologian and Remonstrant 
Simon Fairweather (born 1969), Australian archer
Simon Farine (born 1987), Canadian basketball player
Simon Fernando Sri Chandrasekera (1829-1908), Sri Lankan Sinhala businessman
Simon Gagné (born 1980), Canadian ice hockey player
Simon Gallup (born 1960), bassist in English rock band The Cure
Simon Harris (born 1962), British music producer
Simon Helberg (born 1980), American actor, comedian, and musician
Simon Heslop (born 1987), English footballer
Simon Jolin-Barrette, Canadian lawyer and politician from Quebec
Simon Joyner (born 1971), American singer-songwriter
Simon Keenlyside (born 1959), British baritone
Simon Kidane (born 1975), Ethiopian basketball player
Simon Kuper (born 1969), British author
Simon Lane (born 1978), British comedian and Youtuber
Simon Le Bon (born 1958), lead singer of English band Duran Duran
Simon MacCorkindale, British actor
Simon Madden (born 1957), Australian footballer
Simon Magalashvili (1968), Israeli Olympic judoka
Simon Marcus (1986), Canadian kickboxer
Simon van der Meer (1925–2011), Dutch particle physicist and Nobel Laureate
Simon Mignolet (born 1988), Belgian football player
 Simon Miller, Wrestling Journalist for WhatCulture and Professional wrestler
Simon Monjack (1970–2010), British filmmaker
Simon Neil (born 1979), Scottish guitarist and lead singer of Biffy Clyro
Simon Oakland (1928–1983), American actor
Simon Okker (1881–1944), Dutch Olympic fencer killed in Auschwitz
Simon Pegg (born 1970), English writer and actor
Simon Petliura (1879 –1926), Ukrainian politician and journalist.
Simon Poulsen (born 1984), Danish footballer
Simon Pryce (born 1972), Australian children's lead singer of The Wiggles
Simon H. Rifkind (1901–1995), American lawyer and judge
Simon Rosenbaum (baseball) (born 1993), American-Israeli baseball player with Team Israel
Simon Schama (born 1945), English historian specializing in art, Dutch, and French history
Simon Sears (born 1984), Danish actor
Simon Shirley (born 1966), Australian decathlete
Simon Shnapir (born 1987), American Olympic medalist pair skater
Simon Singer (born 1941), American world champion American handball player, and radio and television actor
Simon Sjödin (born 1986), Swedish swimmer
Simon Steel (born 1969), English cricketer
Simon van der Stel (1639–1712), Dutch Governor of the Cape Colony
Simon Stepaniak (born 1997), American football player
Simon Stevin (1548–1620), Netherlandish mathematician, physicist and engineer
Simon Tahamata (born 1956), Dutch and Belgian footballer
Simon Terry (1974–2021), British archer
Simon Townsend (born 1945) Australian Children's show host and producer
Simon Tong (born 1972), English guitarist and keyboardist formerly of The Verve
Simon Trpčeski (born 1979), Macedonian pianist
Simon Vestdijk (1898–1971), Dutch novelist and poet
Simon Vukčević (born 1986), Montenegrin footballer
Simón Cano Le Tiec (born 1996), Spanish film critic
Simon de Vlieger (1601–1653), Dutch designer, draughtsman, and marine painter
Simon Vroemen (born 1969), Dutch steeplechase runner
Simon Webbe (born 1978), English singer from Blue
Simon Weston OBE (born 1961), British soldier who suffered severe burn injuries during the Falklands War
Simon Wiesenthal (1908–2005), Austrian Holocaust survivor and Nazi hunter
Simon Yam (born 1955), Hong Kong actor/director
 Simeon II of Bulgaria (born 1937), tsar of the Kingdom of Bulgaria

Biblical characters 
 Simeon (Hebrew Bible), second son of Jacob and Leah
 Simon Maccabaeus (died 135 BCE), brother of Judas Maccabeus and ruler of Judea
 Simon Peter, better known as Saint Peter, one of the Twelve Apostles
 Simon the Zealot (also called Simon the Canaanite), another of the Twelve Apostles
 Simon the Leper, resident of Bethany visited by Jesus
 Simon the Tanner (New Testament), resident of Joppa with whom Peter stayed on the way to Caesarea to see Cornelius
 Simon of Cyrene, man forced to carry Jesus' cross
 Simon Magus, magician confronted by Saint Peter and namesake of the term "simony"
 Simon (brother of Jesus)

Fictional characters 

 Simon Adebisi, a sadistic Nigerian inmate in the HBO drama Oz
 Simon Bar Sinister, main antagonist in the television cartoon Underdog
 Simon Basset, a character in Bridgerton
 Simon de Belleme, a baron and evil sorcerer in the television series Robin of Sherwood
 Simon Belmont, one of the main characters of the video game series Castlevania
 Simon Boccanegra, pirate in a Verdi opera by the same name
 Simon Camden, one of the main characters of television drama 7th Heaven
 Simon P. Chillings, a character who appeared in 5 episodes of The Punky Brewster TV sitcom
 Simon Doyle, played by Simon MacCorkindale in the movie Death on the Nile
 Simon Escher, a recurring villain in the espionage television series Burn Notice
 Simon Gold, a uncle of Sally Gold in Tennessee Williams's Little New Orleans Girl
 Simon Grace, one of the main characters of The Spiderwick Chronicles, by Tony DiTerlizzi and Holly Black
 Simon Gruber, antagonist in Die Hard with a Vengeance
 Simon Henriksson, the main protagonist of Cry of Fear
 Simon Laurent, a character from Infinity Train
 Simon Legree, the antagonist of Uncle Tom's Cabin
 Simon Lewis, one of the protagonists in The Mortal Instruments series by Cassandra Clare
 Simon Lynch, a 9-year-old autistic boy and one of the main characters in the film Mercury Rising
 Sir Simon McDuck, a Disney character who is an ancestor of Scrooge McDuck and Donald Duck
 Simon McKay, genius inventor played by David Rappaport on the CBS television series The Wizard.
 Simon Petrikov, more commonly known as the Ice King, a character in the animated television series Adventure Time
 Simon Phoenix, fictional criminal in the 1993 film Demolition Man
 Simon Seville, a fictional animated character from Alvin and the Chipmunks
 Simon Silver, one of the main characters of Red Lights
 Simon Sinestrari, protagonist of the 1971 film Simon, King of the Witches
 Simon Snow, the main character in Rainbow Rowell's novel Carry On
 Simon Spier, the main character in Becky Albertalli's novel Simon vs. the Homo Sapiens Agenda, its follow up Leah on the Offbeat, and film adaptation Love, Simon.
 Simon Tam, fictional character from the television series Firefly
 Simon Templar, main character of Leslie Charteris' The Saint novels
 Simon (Gurren Lagann), protagonist of the anime series Tengen Toppa Gurren Lagann
 Simon (Lord of the Flies), character in Lord of the Flies, by William Golding
 Simon (Trollz), main villain in the television series Trollz
 Simon, a child in the British television programme Simon in the Land of Chalk Drawings
 Simon, a child in the Canadian television programme The Secret Railroad
 Simon, an angel in the 1995 film The Prophecy
 Simon, a character from the animated band Prozzäk
 Simon, a character from the television series The Walking Dead, played by Steven Ogg
 Simple Simon, a character from Simon Says
 Simon Mitterer, an Austrian Lawyer with special hiking and navigation skills.

See also
 Simon (surname)
 Simon (disambiguation)
Sīmanis:Latvian variant of the name Simon.

Notes

Danish masculine given names
Dutch masculine given names
English masculine given names
French masculine given names
German masculine given names
Given names
Jewish given names
Russian masculine given names
Swedish masculine given names
Given names of Hebrew language origin
Given names of Greek language origin

fr:Simon#Prénom